Ri Chol-guk (born December 25, 1985, in Pyongyang) is a North Korean table tennis player. As of May 2012, Ri is ranked no. 86 in the world by the International Table Tennis Federation (ITTF). Ri is a member of the table tennis team for Kigwancha Sports Club, and is coached and trained by Kim Jin Myong. He is also right-handed, and uses the penhold grip.

Ri qualified for the men's singles tournament, along with his teammates Jang Song-Man and Kim Hyok-Bong, at the 2008 Summer Olympics in Beijing, by receiving a place as one of the top 7 seeded players from the Asian Qualification Tournament in Hong Kong. He received a single bye for the first round match, before losing out to Austria's Robert Gardos, with a set score of 3–4.

References

External links
 
 NBC 2008 Olympics profile

1985 births
Living people
North Korean male table tennis players
Table tennis players at the 2008 Summer Olympics
Olympic table tennis players of North Korea
Sportspeople from Pyongyang
Asian Games medalists in table tennis
Table tennis players at the 2006 Asian Games
Table tennis players at the 2010 Asian Games
Medalists at the 2010 Asian Games
Asian Games bronze medalists for North Korea
21st-century North Korean people